
There are over 20,000 Grade II* listed buildings in England. This page is a list of the twelve Grae II* buildings in the district of Spelthorne in Surrey. For links to similar articles in relation to the other 10 districts of Surrey see Grade II* listed buildings in Surrey.

Spelthorne

|}

Notes

References
English Heritage Images of England

External links

Spelthorne
 Spelthorne
Borough of Spelthorne